Epagoge is a genus of moths belonging to the subfamily Tortricinae of the family Tortricidae. The genus was erected by Jacob Hübner in 1825.

Species
Epagoge conspersana Diakonoff, 1953
Epagoge grotiana (Fabricius, 1781)
Epagoge melanatma (Meyrick, 1908)
Epagoge mellosa Diakonoff, 1951
Epagoge metacentra (Meyrick, 1918)
Epagoge occidentalis Diakonoff, 1948
Epagoge vulgaris (Meyrick, 1921)
Epagoge xanthomitra Diakonoff, 1941

See also
List of Tortricidae genera

References

Brown, J. W. (2005). World Catalogue of Insects: Volume 5 Tortricidae

External links
"Epagoge Hubner, [1825] 1816". Tortricid.net.

Archipini
Tortricidae genera
Taxa named by Jacob Hübner